Esdras Alfred de St-Georges (August 4, 1849 – June 19, 1890) was a Quebec lawyer, physician and political figure. He represented Portneuf in the House of Commons of Canada from 1872 to 1878 and from 1882 to 1890 as a Liberal member.

He was born in Cap-Santé, Canada East, the son of Laurent Aurez de St-Georges and Adelaine Allsopp who was the daughter of George Waters Allsopp. He received the degree of M.D. from Victoria College in Cobourg, Ontario and a degree in law from the Université Laval. He practised law at Quebec City and was also a governor of the College of Surgeons and Physicians of Lower Canada. In 1875, de St-Georges married Laura, the daughter of Isidore Thibaudeau. He was elected again in 1878 but unseated after an appeal; he also ran unsuccessfully in the riding of Montmorency in 1880. De St-Georges died in office in 1890 at Cap-Santé.

References 

1849 births
1890 deaths
Liberal Party of Canada MPs
Members of the House of Commons of Canada from Quebec
Université Laval alumni